Enzo Muzii (13 January 1926 – 2 February 2014) was an Italian film director, writer and photographer. In 1968 he won the Jury Grand Prix at the Berlin International Film Festival for his film Something Like Love.

Selected works
Punto di non ritorno, Adelphi, Milano, 1990
Silenzio, si vive: romanzo di profilo, Aragno, Torino, 2003
Fuori dai giochi: tre storie, Aragno, Torino, 2005, vincitore del Premio II Ceppo nel 2006
Il tempo parlerà, Aragno, Torino, 2006

References

External links 

1926 births
2014 deaths
Italian film directors
Italian male writers
Italian photographers